The Government of Sindh  is the provincial government of the province of Sindh, Pakistan. Its powers and structure are set out in the provisions of the 1973 Constitution, in which 30 Districts of 7 Divisions under its authority and jurisdiction. 

The province's head is the Chief Secretary is appointed by the Prime Minister of Pakistan. The Chief Secretary of Sindh is usually a Grade 22 officer, belonging to the Pakistan Administrative Service. 

Although the Governor is the head of the province on paper, it is largely a ceremonial position; and the main powers lie with the Chief Minister of Sindh and Chief Secretary of Sindh.

The province is governed by a unicameral legislature with the head of government known as the Chief Minister. The Chief Minister, invariably a leader of a political party represented in the Assembly, selects members of the provincial Cabinet. 

The terms Government of Sindh or Sindh Government are often used in official documents. The seat of Government is in Karachi, thus serving as the capital of the province.

Executive
The Chief Secretary Sindh, as head of the provincial bureaucracy, is the boss of the province. The provincial Chief Secretary of Grade-22 is equivalent in rank to a Federal Secretary, is appointed by the Prime Minister of Pakistan. Under him comes the entire Government of Sindh.

Currently, there are only 5 Grade-21 Officers in the province.

Governance 
At the Ministerial level, each department is headed by a Provincial Secretary. The Secretary is in-charge of all workings of their department, and in most cases are the Principal Accounting Officers of  their department. Provincial Secretaries are usually Grade-20 Officers. There may also be Grade-21 Secretaries, in cases where the post has not been upgraded by the Chief Minister to that of an Additional Chief Secretary. 

Apart from the Ministerial level, the Government of Sindh exercises its powers and function through Divisions and Districts. The Commissioners are in-charge of Divisions while Deputy Commissioners are in-charge of Districts. Commissioners report directly to the Chief Secretary are responsibly for everything in their Divisions. There are 6 Divisions, namely; Karachi, Hyderabad, Sukkur, Larkana, Mirpurkhas, and Shaheed Benazirbad. Commissioners are usually Officers of the rank of Grade-20 while the Commissioner Karachi Division is of the Grade-21 rank, as Karachi Division is the most important Division in all of Pakistan.

Top-Personnel

Departments

Ministry Level 
Ministry level departments are usually headed by a Secretary who reports to the Chief Secretary and Chief Minister. The number of ministers in the cabinet is fixed, so a single minister can have multiple portfolios.

 Planning & Development Board
Planning & Development Department
Services, General Administration, Coordination Department
Services Wing
General Administration Wing
Inter Provincial Coordination Wing
I&C Wing
Training Management & Research Management Wing
Board of Revenue
Enquiries & Anti-Corruption Establishment
Local Government, Housing & Town Planning Department
Home Department
Chief Minister's  Inspection, Enquiries & Implementation Team
Universities and Boards Department
Food Department
Finance Department
Health Department

 Culture, Tourism, Antiquities & Archives Department
 Livestock & Fisheries  Department
 Auqaf, Religious Affairs, Zakat & Ushr Department
Works & Services Department
 Information Department
 Excise, Taxation & Narcotics Control
 Population Welfare Department
 Labour & Human Resources Department
 Law & Parliamentary Affairs Department
 Irrigation Department
 Agriculture, Supply & Prices Department
 Forest, & Wildlife  Department
 Information, Science & Technology Department
 Cooperative Department
 Women Development Department
 Transport & Mass Transit Department
 Industries & Commerce Department
 Human Settlement Department
 Social Welfare Department
 Mines & Minerals Development Department
 Rehabilitation Department
 Energy Department 
 Sports & Youth Affairs Department
 Public Health Engineering & Rural Development Department
 College Education Department
 School Education & Literacy Department
 Environment, Climate Change & Coastal Development Department
 Investment Department
 Minorities Affairs Department
 Human Rights Department

See also
Pakistan Administrative Service
Chief Secretary Sindh
Chief Minister of Sindh
Governor of Sindh

References

External links 
 Government of Sindh official website 

 
Provincial Governments of Pakistan